Bumblebee catfish may refer to the entire family Pseudopimelodidae. Many species of Pseudomystus may be referred to as bumblebee catfish. or false bumblebee catfish. This name may also refer to a number of different catfish species with colouration reminiscent of that of a bumblebee:

 African bumblebee catfish, Microsynodontis batesii
 Asian bumblebee catfish, Pseudomystus siamensis
 Bumblebee jelly catfish, Batrochoglanis raninus
 Giant bumblebee catfish, Pseudopimelodus bufonius
 False bumblebee catfish, an undescribed species similar to Pseudomystus stenomus
 Mottled bumblebee catfish, an undescribed species similar to Pseudomystus leiacanthus
 South American bumblebee catfish, Microglanis iheringi

References
 

Pseudopimelodidae
Fish common names